China participated in the ninth Winter Paralympics in Turin, Italy.

Athletes
China entered eight athletes in the following sports:

Alpine skiing: 1 male
 Wang Lei
Nordic skiing: 4 males, 3 females
 Fu Chunshan
 Han Lixia
 Peng Yuanyuan
 Sun Qiu
 Wang Jinyou
 Zhang Jie
 Zhang Nannan

Medalists

See also
China at the 2006 Winter Olympics

External links
Torino 2006 Paralympic Games, IPC

China at the Winter Paralympics
Nations at the 2006 Winter Paralympics
2006 in Chinese sport